Srood Salem Matti Maqdasy is an Iraqi-Assyrian physician, politician, and a member of the Kurdistan Regional Government Parliament. Maqdasy is one of just eleven representatives elected to represent minority groups in Iraqi Kurdistan's 111-member assembly. Maqdasy represents an Assyrian-led political party named Sons of Mesopotamia (Bnay Nahrain), and was first elected to the parliament in 2013. He is currently one of five Assyrians serving in the assembly. Maqdasy was formerly a member of the Assyrian Democratic Movement.

Early life 
Srood Maqdasy was born in Ankawa, Iraq, where he grew up in a relatively safe neighborhood, populated by Assyrians. His father was a government employee, working in the directorate of agriculture in Erbil. His father had previously served in the Iraqi Army as a soldier during the Iraq-Iran War. His mother was a housewife who Maqdasy says held their family together during his father's deployments during the war.

He recalls his childhood as a simple one, where most were happy with what they had. Reflecting on his childhood, Maqdasy was quoted saying:

"We were happy and content with what we had, much more than the complicated life children are leading nowadays. We felt safe playing in the streets or other public places with family members and friends. Occasionally, there were some unpleasant events that befell our community from time to time, especially when we received the bodies of our martyrs of the Iran-Iraq War. I can't forget their faces. The cries of the souls of their loved ones still haunt me today."

Education 
Srood Maqdasy completed his master's degree in orthopedic surgery from Salahaddin University in Erbil, where he also completed his Bachelors and graduated from the College of Medicine. He had previously attended grade school in Ankawa.

Medical career 
After graduating from the College of Medicine in Erbil, Maqdasy started working as an intern physician at various hospitals in Erbil. He later worked as an orthopedic senior house adviser at Erbil Teaching Hospital. Soon afterwards, he was promoted to an orthopedic senior officer, where he was awarded a high degree of specialty in orthopedic surgery.

Political career 
Maqdasy became involved in political work when he joined the Assyrian Democratic Movement in 1997. He held various positions in the organization's Erbil branch. In 2007, he was elected to serve as the head of the fifth conference of the ADM in Duhok, and three years later in 2010, was elected to serve as a member of the party's oversight committee during its seventh conference in Baghdad.

Maqdasy says he pursued a career in politics to be an advocate for his Assyrian (also called Chaldeans and Syriacs) people who had suffered from neglect and marginalization since the early 1900s. He stated he believes the national identity and ethnic rights of Assyrians have been denied in Iraq, despite the fact that they are the indigenous people of the land.

In 2013, Maqdasy resigned from the ADM, along with a number of the party's leaders and members, including some co-founders of the ADM. He was part of the formation of the new political party Sons of Mesopotamia, or Abnaa Al-Nahrain, which they felt embodied a new vision. Maqdasy was elected to serve in the Kurdistan Regional Government Parliament in 2013 representing Abnaa Al-Nahrain.

Quotes 
‘‘We’ve been here as an ethnicity for 6,000 years and as Christians for 1,700 years,’’ says Dr. Srood Maqdasy, a member of the Kurdish Parliament. ‘‘We have our own culture, language and tradition. If we live within other communities, all of this will be dissolved within two generations.’’

References 

1975 births
Living people